Baratabad (also Romanized as Barātābād; also known as Kalāteh-ye Karbalā’ī Barāt) is a village in Sefid Sang Rural District, Qalandarabad District, Fariman County, Razavi Khorasan Province, Iran. At the 2006 census, its population was 197, in 49 families.

See also 

 List of cities, towns and villages in Razavi Khorasan Province

References 

Populated places in Fariman County